The Boys Next Door is a 1996 American made-for-television drama film based on a play by Tom Griffin which was published in 1983 under the title Damaged Hearts, Broken Flowers and again in 1988 under the title The Boys Next Door.  The movie was produced by Hallmark Entertainment as a Hallmark Hall of Fame film.

Plot
Four intellectually disabled men share a house and are looked after by Jack (Tony Goldwyn), their social worker.  The four men try to make sense of a mixed-up world, dealing with everything from runaway rodents to helping Norman (Nathan Lane), who has a new girlfriend (Mare Winningham).  Jack's life with his wife is put on hold, and he feels it's time to let them go.

Cast
 Tony Goldwyn as Jack
 Nathan Lane as Norman
 Courtney B. Vance as Lucien
 Michael Jeter as Arnold
 Robert Sean Leonard as Barry Klemper
 Mare Winningham as Sheila
 Jenny Robertson as Rena
 Elizabeth Wilson as Mary
 Richard Jenkins as Bob Klemper
 Lynne Thigpen as Mrs. Tracy
 Caroline Aaron as Mrs. Warren

Awards
 1997 	Won: Christopher Award	
 1996  Nominated: Primetime Emmy Award for Outstanding Supporting Actress in a Limited Series or Movie - Mare Winningham
 1996 	Nominated: Humanitas Prize
 1997 	Won: WGA Award

External links
 

Films directed by John Erman
American films based on plays
Hallmark Hall of Fame episodes
1996 television films
Films set in the 20th century
1996 films
Television shows based on plays
1996 drama films
1990s English-language films